The Queensland Police Service (QPS) is the principal law enforcement agency responsible for policing the Australian state of Queensland. In 1990, the Queensland Police Force was officially renamed the Queensland Police Service and the old motto of 'Firmness with Courtesy' was changed to 'With Honour We Serve'. The headquarters of the Queensland Police Service is located at 200 Roma Street, Brisbane.

The current Commissioner is Katarina Carroll. The Commissioner reports to the Minister for Police, presently Mark Ryan.

History 

Queensland came into existence as a colony of the British Empire on 1 December 1859. The region was previously under the jurisdiction of the New South Wales governance with towns policed by small forces controlled by the local magistracy. The Police Act of 1838 (2 Vic. no. 2) which officially codified a variety of common behaviours as criminal and regulated the police response to them, continued as the template for policing. On 13 January 1860, Edric Norfolk Vaux Morisset was appointed the Inspector-General of the Queensland Police. Queensland was divided into 17 districts, each with its own police force headed by a Chief Constable under authority of a local magistrate. The position of Inspector-General was abolished soon after it was established, in July 1860, and most of the operations of the police until 1863 reverted to the control of local police magistrates and justices.

The Queensland Police underwent a major reform in 1864 and the newly re-organised force commenced operations with approximately 143 employees under the command the first Commissioner of Police, David Thompson Seymour. The service had four divisions: Metropolitan Police, Rural Police, Water Police, and Native Police. At the turn of the century there were 845 men and 135 Aboriginal trackers at 256 stations in Queensland.

1900s 
In 1904 the Queensland Police started to use fingerprinting in investigations. In the 1912 Brisbane general strike the Queensland Police were used to suppress striking workers. The first female police officers, Ellen O'Donnell and Zara Dare, were inducted in March 1931 to assist in inquiries involving female suspects and prisoners. Following World War II a number of technological innovations were adopted including radio for communication within Queensland and between state departments. By 1950 the Service had a staff of 2,030 police officers, 10 women police and 30 trackers.
In February 1951, a central communication room was established at the Criminal Investigation Branch in Brisbane.

1960s and 1970s 
On 14 May 1963, the Juvenile Aid Bureau was established. In 1965 female officers were given the same powers as male officers. The Queensland Police Academy at Oxley, Brisbane, was completed in 1972. Bicycles were phased out in 1975 and more cars and motorcycles were put into service. The Air Wing also became operational in 1975 following the purchase of two single-engine aircraft.

1980s 
The decade was a turbulent period in Queensland's political history. Allegations of high-level corruption in both the Queensland Police and State Government led to a judicial inquiry presided over by Tony Fitzgerald. The Fitzgerald Inquiry which ran from July 1987 to July 1989 led to charges being laid against many long-serving police, including Jack Herbert, Licensing Branch Sergeant Harry Burgess, Assistant Commissioner Graeme Parker and Commissioner Terry Lewis. Lewis was jailed and served ten and a half years.

The Fitzgerald Inquiry also led to a perjury trial against former Premier Joh Bjelke-Petersen, which ended with a hung jury. The Director of Public Prosecutions elected not to pursue a retrial due to Bjelke-Petersen's age and health. It was later revealed that the jury foreman for the trial was a member of the Young Nationals and identified with the 'friends of Joh' movement.

The Criminal Justice Commission was established in 1989 by the Queensland Criminal Justice Act 1989, following widespread corruption amongst high-level Queensland politicians and police officers being uncovered in the Fitzgerald Inquiry. It has since merged in 2002 with the Queensland Crime Commission to form the Crime and Misconduct Commission. The Criminal Justice Commission was responsible for significant research into the Queensland Police Service.

A new computerised message switching system was put into use throughout Queensland in 1980. At the time it was one of the most effective police communication systems in Australia.

1990s 
The Police Powers and Procedures Act 1997 was passed by the Queensland Government on 1 July 1997 and took effect 6 April 1998. Law enforcement equipment introduced in the 1990s include oleoresin capsicum (OC) spray, the Smith & Wesson revolver firearm and later the Glock semi-automatic pistol, the long 26" baton to the 21" extendable baton, and linked to hinged handcuffs in 1998, and Light Detection and Ranging (LIDAR) laser-based detection devices and an Integrated Traffic Camera System in 1999 to enforce traffic speed limits.

2000s 
The Police Powers and Responsibilities Act 2000 came into force in July 2000 which consolidated the majority of police powers into one Act. The Queensland Police contributed to the national CrimTrac system and the National Automated Fingerprint Identification System (NAFIS), established in 2000. The Crime and Misconduct Act 2001 commenced 1 January 2002 and redefined the responsibilities of the Service and the Crime and Misconduct Commission (CMC) with respect to the management of complaints. The CMC also has a witness protection function. The CMC has investigative powers, not ordinarily available to the Queensland Police, for the purposes of enabling the commission to effectively investigate particular cases of major crime. The CMC also has the power to investigate cases of misconduct in the Queensland public sector, particularly the more serious cases of misconduct. In 2013, the CMC became the Crime and Corruption Commission.

In 2002 there were 8,367 police officers (20.2% female) and 2,925 staff members at 321 stations, 40 Police Beat shopfronts and 21 Neighbourhood Police Beats throughout the state. By 2004 the Service had grown to 9,003 police officers (21.8% female) and 2,994 other staff members. As at 30 June 2016 there were 11,971 police officers (26.3% female) and 2,794 other staff members.

The Taser conducted electrical weapon (CEW) was trialled by some officers in 2006 and was eventually issued in 2009. In mid-2007, approximately 5,000 officers participated in the Pride in Policing march through Brisbane.

2010s
In 2013 following a change in government, another government department named the Public Safety Business Agency was created. This was following a recommendation of the Keelty review into police and community safety operations. Human resources, information technology and other divisions were transferred from the Service and other departments to the new agency. In mid-2016, some services were moved back to the Service. Eight geographic regions (Far Northern, Northern, Central, North Coast, Metropolitan North, Metropolitan South, Southern, and South Eastern) was reduced to five (Northern, Central, Southern, Brisbane, South Eastern). Some statewide functions and administrative divisions were also adjusted.

Following the G20 political forum, the Service created its third unit citation. The other two Queensland Honours citations were the 'flood and cyclone' (2011) and the 'QP150' (2014) for the Service's sesquicentennial year.

The Queensland Police marked 150 years of service to the State of Queensland on 1 January 2014.

In 2015 the Commissioner approved officers and staff members to march in the Brisbane Pride Festival as part of showing organisational diversity, and accessibility of policing services to the LGBTI communities.

2020s
In February 2020, an organisational restructure was announced; but a month later, staffing then being diverted to support the health response to the COVID-19 pandemic, including border closures, and maintaining quarantine hotels.  Early in 2021, due to two separate incidents, a new 'Youth Crime Taskforce' was formed under an assistant commissioner, and another section was elevated to command level to become the Domestic, Family Violence and Vulnerable Persons Command.

A commission of inquiry was created in May 2022 to examine policing responses to domestic and family violence prevention, with an August appearance of Commissioner Carroll.  The commission was told of a lack of staffing of the Domestic, Family Violence and Vulnerable Persons Command compared to other areas, and of senior officers' misogynistic comments.  A deputy commissioner resigned the next day.

Criticisms 
The Queensland Police Special Bureau was formed on 30 July 1940 and renamed Special Branch on 7 April 1948. It was criticised for being used for political purposes by the Bjelke-Petersen government in the 1970s and 1980s, such as enforcing laws against protests (sometimes outnumbering the protesters or using provocateurs to incite violence so the protesters could be arrested) and investigating and harassing political opponents. It was disbanded in 1989 following a recommendation by the Fitzgerald Inquiry into police corruption. Special Branch records were shredded.

In 1991, an arrest was recorded by journalist Chris Reason on live TV. In the video, a plain clothes officer and other officers are seen restraining a man and putting him in the back of a car. The man was reportedly an international criminal from Europe but it was later found to be some one else. This was an embarrassment for the QPS and it came to be known as 'Democracy Manifest'.

In 1994 six police officers, becoming known as the 'Pinkenba Six', took three Aboriginal boys from Fortitude Valley and left them at Pinkenba as an unofficial way to punish the boys for suspected offences. The police officers were charged with abduction but were subsequently acquitted in court; the police service put them on twelve months probation for their errors of judgement.

The Service has been accused of institutional racism after its fierce support of Senior Sergeant Chris Hurley who stood trial for the 2004 assault and manslaughter of Mulrunji Doomadgee. Senior Sergeant Hurley was initially subject of a Coronial Inquest by Coroner Christine Clements where he was found to have a case to answer despite conflicting medical evidence. The Director of Public Prosecutions Leanne Clare refused to place Senior Sergeant Hurley on trial for lack of evidence. After reviewing the evidence the Crime and Misconduct Commission (CMC) also found that there was insufficient evidence to prosecute for wrongdoing. The Queensland Attorney General Kerry Shine ordered a review despite advice from the State Solicitor-General Walter Sofronoff QC highlighting the lack of evidence. A review by New South Wales Former Chief Justice Sir Laurence Street found there was a case to answer. Senior Sergeant Hurley was found not guilty by a jury in the Townsville Supreme Court and the findings of the Coronial Inquest were subsequently overturned by the Queensland District Court. The District Court ruled that Coroner's finding '...was against the weight of the evidence'.

Also in 2006 and 2008 footage was caught of police beating homeless men after they were pinned to the ground. It came a year after a report by organisations including the Queensland Council of Social Service (QCOSS) and community groups such as the Red Cross, which detailed widespread harassment by police of the socially vulnerable. Approximately 75% of interviewees made such claims, but the report was ignored by the government. Police Minister Judy Spence said of the report
'At a cursory glance, it looks like a compendium of views from nameless, homeless people'.

In 2008, the CMC investigated an officer after he used a Taser on a teenage girl at South Bank, but recommended the officer only receive 'managerial guidance'. The incident was also against police policy to use tasers on minors. Police later charged the girl with breaching a move on order, but the case was thrown out with the magistrate criticising police's over-reaction. A subsequent inquiry by the CMC into the use of the TASER by the Queensland Police Service found there was no systemic abuse of the device by officers, despite the chairman saying the incident 'showed a concerning pattern within QPS towards the handling of policing incidents'. CCTV video footage was released, delayed by possible civil action, showing the girl lashing out and kicking the officer, knocking the Taser out of his holster before he used it as she was held on the ground by two security guards.

In June 2009 a man died after allegedly being tasered by Queensland police 28 times. The policeman in question claimed the deceased was tasered a much lower number of times, suggesting the device was making erroneous readings. The coronial inquest later found this not to be the case, and that the officer tasered the man 28 times for up to five seconds at a time.

In early 2010, searches were made by the CMC (Crime and Misconduct Commission) on police stations in Queensland. The results of the searches and interrogations of police officers are being kept confidential, but come less than a year after a CMC report claiming:

the evidence revealed an attitude on the part of a not insignificant number of police officers, and their supervisors, that it was acceptable to act in ways that ignored legislative and QPS policy requirements, that were improper, and in some cases were dishonest and unlawful. Based on past experiences, the CMC had no confidence that the attitudes of those police officers would change without the pressure of public exposure.

The CMC report focused on police corruption, and not police brutality that accounted for ten times as many complaints in Surfers Paradise – 130 reports to 13 in the 18 months to March 2010.

Arising from an earlier Women's Safety and Justice Taskforce, in May 2022 a commission of inquiry was announced to examine policing responses to domestic and family violence prevention, with possible systemic cultural issues within the organisation, and whether there was the capability, capacity, and structure to respond to the violence.  Giving evidence in August 2022, Police Commissioner Carroll accepted 'there was a problem within QPS with misogynistic and disrespectful views towards women affecting how police officers responded to domestic and family violence'.

Regions 

Between 1991 and 2013 there were eight geographic regions (Far Northern, Northern, Central, North Coast, Metropolitan North, Metropolitan South, Southern, and South Eastern), three commands (State Crime Operations, Operations Support, and Ethical Standards), and four divisions (Human Resources, Finance, Administration, and Information Management).

As of 2017, there are five police regions and eight commands in the State of Queensland, each under command of an assistant commissioner: Regional Operations (Northern, Central, Brisbane, Southern, and South Eastern), Specialist Operations (Community Contact Command, Intelligence, Counter-Terrorism and Major Events Command, Operations Support Command, State Crime Command, Road Policing Command, and Commonwealth Games Group), and Strategy, Policy and Performance (Crime and Corruption Commission Police Group, Ethical Standards Command, Legal Division, Organisational Capability Command, and People Capability Command).  The regions were further divided into districts and further still into divisions. A new government department, the Public Safety Business Agency, existed from 2013 to 2021 which took over the portfolios of human resources, finance, administration, education and training, and information technology).

By 2022, there were two new regions:

 Regional Queensland
 Far Northern Region
 Northern Region
 Central Region
 Operations Support Command
 Road Policing and Regional Support Command
 Southern Queensland
 North Coast Region 
 Brisbane Region
 Southern Region
 South Eastern Region
 Communications, Culture and Engagement Division
 People Capability Command
 Crime, Counter-Terrorism and Specialist Operations
 Crime and Corruption Commission Police Group
 Crime and Intelligence Command 
 Domestic, Family Violence and Vulnerable Persons Command
 Ethical Standards Command
 Security and Counter-Terrorism Command
 Strategy and Corporate Services
 Finance Services Division 
 Frontline and Digital Services 
 Human Resources Division 
 Internal Audit and Risk
 Legal Division
 Organisational Capability Command
 Policy and Performance Division 
 Safety, Wellbeing and Central Panels Division

Ranks and structure 

The Queensland Police Service has three classes of uniformed personnel: police officers ('sworn' and 'unsworn'), and staff members (public servants: police liaison officers, watchhouse officers, and pipes and drums musicians). Both classes wear the same blue uniform with shoulder patches, however:
 pipes and drums musicians have hard board epaulettes and with pipes and drums wording;
 police liaison officers (PLOs) are distinguished by a yellow chequered band and a 'Police Liaison Officer' badge; and
 watchhouse officer have grey epaulettes stating 'watchhouse officer'.

The third class occurred about 2020 when the State Government Protective Security Section (SGPSS), under the Department of Public Works, was transferred to the Queensland Police Service and renamed as protective service officers.  They are sworn employees under the State Buildings Protective Security Act 1983, and wear a white shirt with a maroon-coloured police shoulder patch with 'Protective Services' above it, and maroon epaulettes.

As of 2015 all rank insignia changed to an 'ink blue' background with insignia embroidered in white. There has been the addition of a 'recognition of service' horizontal bar between rank insignia and the words 'Queensland Police' for officers who have been on rank for a particular length of time. This 'recognition of service' is only for the ranks from senior constable to senior sergeant as highlighted below.

Ranks of the Queensland Police Service are as follows:

Staff members 
 Torres Strait Island Police Support Officer (green/white/blue epaulette with embroidered 'TORRES STRAIT ISLAND POLICE SUPPORT OFFICER' and rank)
 Police Liaison Officer (yellow or blue/green (Torres Strait) epaulette with embroidered 'POLICE LIAISON OFFICER')
 Recruit (light blue epaulette with embroidered 'POLICE RECRUIT')

Constable ranks 
 Constable (plain blue)
 Senior constable (two embroidered chevrons)

Non-commissioned ranks 
 Sergeant (three embroidered chevrons)
 Senior sergeant (embroidered crown with laurels)

Commissioned ranks 
 Inspector (three pips)
 Superintendent (one crown and one pip)
 Chief superintendent (one crown and two pips)
 Assistant commissioner (crossed tipstaves with laurels)
 Deputy commissioner (one pip and crossed tipstaves with laurels)
 Commissioner (one crown and crossed tipstaves with laurels)

Rank insignia is worn only by uniformed officers. Prior to mid-2009, only officers at the rank of inspector and above (commissioned officers) had the words 'Queensland Police' embroidered on their epaulettes, however new uniform mandates saw the introduction of the words 'Queensland Police' on all epaulettes issued to police officers after this date. The epaulettes of commissioned officers are significantly larger than the epaulettes of lesser ranks. Different salary bands apply within the same rank commensurate with years of service. Officers relieving at a higher rank temporarily wear the epaulettes of the higher rank.

Police officers and other members may be eligible to wear Queensland and Australian honours.

Specialist areas 

Officers must serve a minimum of three years in general duties before being permitted to serve in specialist areas such as:
 Child Protection and Investigation Unit (CPIU), formerly the Juvenile Aid Bureau (JAB)
 Criminal Investigation Branch (CIB)
 Dog Squad
 Forensic Crash Unit, formerly the Accident Investigation Squad (AIS), and before that, the Traffic Accident Investigation Squad (TAIS)
 Forensic Services Branch
 Mounted Unit
 Police Prosecutions Corps (PPC)
 Railway Squad
 Scenes of Crime
 Special Emergency Response Team (SERT)
 Major and Organised Crime (Rural) (MOCS), formerly Stock and Regional Crime Investigation Squad (SARCIS), formerly the Stock Squad
 Taskforce Maxima (investigating, disrupting and dismantling outlaw motorcycle gangs)
 Road Policing Units (RPU), formerly Traffic Branch
 Intelligence analyst
 Water Police
 Public Safety Response Team (PSRT), including the Mobile Response Capability (MRC)
 District Education and Training Office (DETO)
 Police Citizens Youth Club (PCYC)
 Tactical Crime Squad (TCS)
 Rapid Action and Patrol (RAP)
 Polair, relating to helicopters and remote pilotless aircraft, separate to a police airwing which are fixed wing transport aircraft.

Commissioners 

The following list chronologically records those who have held the post of Commissioner of the Queensland Police Service.

Equipment 
Standard equipment issued and worn on duty belt or load bearing vest by a uniformed police officer:
 Glock 22 pistol .40-calibre
 3x magazines plus 90 rounds of ammunition
 Extendable baton (21") concealed within pouch
 Saflok Mark 5 hinged handcuffs
 Motorola APX 8000 radio and radio pouch
 OC (oleoresin capsicum) spray within pouch
 X26 Taser
 Axon Enterprise Body 2, Flex 2, Body 3 body worn cameras (BWC)
 Apple iPads and iPhones to access the operational computer QPRIME, given the name 'QLiTE'.
 Load bearing vest

Officers, if necessary, can access the Remington Patrolman R4 carbine service rifle if qualified.

Supplier of belt and pouches is TripleB Leathercraft and Tote Systems.

Other equipment provided to officers include:
 Maglite
 Lightweight medic gloves and voice recording devices

Officers around the state now have an option of an equipment vest (load bearing vest) which is designed to transfer the weight from the hips to the torso. The vest holds the radio, handcuffs and OC spray. Originally this was a general accoutrement vest (GAV) which were extremely unpopular and rarely used, and in the 2010s, the load bearing vest (LBV) which is worn by most operational officers.

Body worn video technology was introduced following a trial in 2015.

Fleet 

In the 1980s to 2010s, the Holden Commodore, Ford Falcon and Toyota Aurion made up most of the fleet of both general duties and highway patrol operations. In more recent years however, with the ceasing of production of these locally produced models, makes such as the Hyundai Sonata have been used as general duties vehicles, while the Subaru Levorg and Kia Stinger have been employed for use as highway patrol vehicles. Hyundai iLoads and modified Isuzu D-Maxs are used as transport vehicles.

The Toyota Camry Hybrid and Toyota RAV4 Hybrid has become the primary general duties vehicles in metropolitan areas, replacing the remaining Holden Commodores, as well as older Hyundai Sonatas.

Gallery 

The SERT (Special Emergency Response Team) unit also has two specialised armoured vehicles, Lenco BearCats, at its disposal for use in riot control and other potentially dangerous situations throughout the Brisbane/South Eastern and Northern police regions, with one vehicle stationed in Brisbane and Cairns each.

From 1996 to 2015, nominated vehicles were fitted with other 200 in-car computers supplied by the state transport department, the Mobile Integrated Network Data Access (MINDA) units. From April 2012, automatic number plate recognition technology was fitted to road policing unit vehicles, follow earlier trials. Queensland Police has received its first police helicopter, based on the Gold Coast in 2012. The helicopter was used for a six-month trial period. The highly anticipated $1.6 million Bell 206 Long Ranger has already been hailed a success, assisting police in 24 different dispatches in its first three days of operation, and will be used extensively during major events such as Schoolies Week and the Gold Coast 600. The helicopter is fitted out with state-of-the-art equipment such as infrared and thermal imaging cameras, and other equipment based on the NSW Police Force helicopters. A second helicopter a BO 105 was introduced by July 2014 in time for the G20 summit in November, responsible for patrolling Brisbane and the Sunshine Coast. The helicopters have Forward Looking Infrared (FLIR) and Searchlight (TRAKKA beam) capabilities.
In a first for an Australian police department, Queensland Police have purchased numerous unmanned aerial vehicles (UAVs; i.e. drones) which have already been used for surveillance purposes in numerous situations where sending in officers is deemed too risky such as during sieges or hostage rescue operations. They can also be used to aerially examine crime scenes.

Queensland Water Police operate three purpose-designed 23 m patrol vessels and numerous smaller rigid-hulled inflatable boats.

Officers killed in the line of duty 

 12 December 2022: Constables Matthew Arnold and Rachel McCrow were killed in an ambush in Wieambilla, near Dalby, southern Queensland.  A neighbour was also killed, and two other officers attacked.
 26 June 2021: Senior Constable David Masters, 53, was struck and killed by a stolen vehicle on the Bruce Highway in Burpengary, north of Brisbane.
 29 May 2017: Senior Constable Brett Forte was shot and killed at Adare, north of Gatton, after attempting to apprehend a suspected offender. The gunman, Rick Maddison, was shot and killed the next day by police while trying to escape after a siege in a farmhouse at Ringwood, north-west of Gatton. On 8 June 2018, the police helicopter Polair 2 was named Brett A. Forte in his honour. Polair 2 had provided air support during the siege.
 29 May 2011: Detective Senior Constable Damien Leeding (CIB) was shot when he confronted an armed offender at the Pacific Pines Tavern on the Gold Coast. Leeding died in hospital on 1 June three days after being shot.
 1 December 2010: Sergeant Daniel Stiller, 33, was killed when his motorcycle collided with a jack-knifing truck on the Bruce Highway while on 'wide load' escort duty.
 18 July 2007: Constable Brett Irwin, 33, was shot while executing an arrest warrant for breach of bail at Keperra, in northwest Brisbane.
 22 August 2003: Senior Sergeant Perry Irwin, 42, was shot while investigating reports of gunfire in bushland at Caboolture, north of Brisbane.
 21 July 2000: Senior Constable Norman Watt, 33, was shot during an armed stand-off at Alton Downs near Rockhampton, Central Queensland.
 21 May 1996: Constable Shayne Gill, Struck by a motor vehicle while on radar duty on the Bruce Highway near Glasshouse Mountains.
 29 June 1989: Constable Brett Handran was shot attending a domestic dispute in Wynnum, in east Brisbane.
 29 July 1987: Senior Constable Peter Kidd was shot in a raid at Virginia, in north Brisbane.
 29 February 1984: Constable Michael Low was shot attending a domestic dispute at North Rockhampton, central Queensland.
 2 November 1975: Senior Constable Lyle Hoey was deliberately run down by a car near Mount Molloy in North Queensland.
 9 April 1969: Senior Constable Colin Brown was shot while investigating the behaviour of a farm employee on a property near Dayboro, north of Brisbane.
 27 March 1968: Constable Douglas Gordon was shot attending a domestic disturbance at Inala, in south Brisbane.
 26 October 1964: Senior Constable Desmond Trannore was shot attending a domestic disturbance near Gordonvale, North Queensland.
 14 February 1963: Senior Constable Cecil Bagley was electrocuted when he tried to rescue a neighbour being electrocuted in his car at Mount Gravatt, south Brisbane. Although at home, his death was deemed to have occurred while on duty because, as a police officer, he was always expected to respond in an emergency situation.
 16 August 1962: Constable Douglas Wrembeck stopped to question a motorist in South Brisbane and was killed when he was struck by a car driven by a hit-and-run driver.
 19 February 1962: Constable Gregory Olive was shot in the chest at close range when he knocked on a front door to make inquiries at Kelvin Grove, Brisbane.
 1 April 1956: Constable First Class Roy Doyle died in hospital at Mackay from head injuries sustained when he hit a submerged block of concrete while attempting a rescue in the flooded Pioneer River at Mackay on 29 March 1956.
 28 November 1938: Constable George Robert Young of the water police was one of four men on a RAAF amphibious aircraft which crashed killing all on board. They were searching for the body of missing woman Marjorie Norval in the estuaries of Moreton Bay when the aircraft hit high tension wires.
 6 August 1930: Constable Ernest James Dawson was on traffic duty on the Yungaburra Road near Lake Barrine when he lost control of his motorcycle. Despite emergency surgery which appeared initially successful, complications arose and he died in Brisbane General Hospital on 18 January 1931.
 27 September 1906: Sergeant Thomas Heaney died at South Brisbane from head fractures sustained when he was hit multiple times over the head with a metal bar during an arrest on 7 June 1905 at Woolloongabba, Brisbane.
 23 December 1905: Constable Albert Price was stabbed while making an arrest at Mackay.
 16 September 1904: Constable First Class Charles O'Kearney was knocked down by a horse being deliberately ridden towards him in retaliation for an arrest in Laidley.
 29 March 1903: Acting Sergeant David Johnston was killed by being hit on the head with an axe by a prisoner in the watchhouse at Mackay.
 30 March 1902: Constable George Doyle was shot while attempting to capture the Kenniff brothers, who had a long history of stealing cattle and horses, in Upper Warrego.
 2 July 1895: Senior Constable William Conroy was stabbed several times trying to prevent a man from stabbing the man's wife on Thursday Island.
 6 September 1894: Constable Edward Lanigan was shot in the chest while trying to prevent another policeman from being shot during an arrest at Montalbion (a mining town near Irvinebank).
 10 May 1894: Constable Benjamin Ebbitt died at South Brisbane having never recovered from an assault during an arrest on 9 November 1890 at Croydon.
 4 February 1893: Constable James Sangster, 25, drowned while attempting a rescue of two members of the Jackson family during the 1893 flood of the Bremer River at North Ipswich. He is commemorated by the James Sangster Memorial at North Ipswich, which was initiated by the Jackson family and funded by public subscription. 
 27 October 1889: Senior Constable Alfred Wavell was shot at Corinda (southwest of Burketown) by a man who had escaped from the Normanton lock-up.
 26 January 1883: Constable William Dwyer was struck on the head by a tomahawk by an Aboriginal near Juandah Station via Taroom.
 24 January 1883: Cadet Sub-Inspector Mark Beresford was speared in the thigh and hit on the head by Aboriginals in the Selwyn Ranges to the south of Cloncurry.
 24 September 1881: Sub-Inspector Henry Kaye was speared through the chest by Aboriginals at Woolgar gold fields (100 km north of Richmond).
 24 January 1881: Sub-Inspector George Dyas was found buried after being speared in the back by Aboriginals while he camped near the 40 Mile Waterhole near Normanton.
 6 November 1867: Constable Patrick Cahill and Constable John Power were poisoned and shot in the head at the Mackenzie River Crossing while escorting a consignment of bank notes and bullion from Rockhampton to Clermont.

See also 

 Crime in Brisbane
 Crime in Australia
 Lucas Inquiry
 Queensland Council for Civil Liberties
 History of the Queensland Police

Notes

References

Attribution 
This article was originally based on material from Queensland Police Commissioners, © State of Queensland (Queensland Police Service) 2019, released under CC-BY-4.0 licence, accessed on 23 April 2019.

External links 
 Queensland Police Service
 Public Safety Business Agency
 Dangerous Liaisons - CMC investigation, July 2009
 G.E. Fitzgerald (1989) "Report of a Commission of Inquiry Pursuant to Orders in Council" Commission of Inquiry into Possible Illegal Activities and Associated Police Misconduct Queensland Government Printer.
 Two books about crime and corruption in the Queensland police—Gold Coast Writers Association, 2014.
 Queensland Police Service: Disaster management and social media: a case study
 

 
1864 establishments in Australia
Emergency services in Queensland
Law enforcement agencies of Queensland